Jil may refer to:
 Jil (film), a 2015 Indian Telugu-language action film
 Jil, Armenia
 Japan Institute of Labour
 Jaringan Islam Liberal, liberal Islam network in Indonesia
 Java Intermediate Language, a computer language
 Jesus Is Lord Church Worldwide, commonly known as Jesus Is Lord Church or JIL Church
 Jilin Ertaizi Airport, a military airport that formerly served commercial flights to Jilin City in Jilin Province, China
 Joint Innovation Lab, a joint venture between Vodafone, Verizon Wireless, China Mobile and SoftBank Mobile
 University of Pennsylvania Journal of International Law

People 
 Jil Caplan (born 1965), French singer-songwriter
 Jil Y. Creek, Austrian guitar virtuoso
 Kim Jil (1422–1478), scholar-official of the early Joseon Dynasty in Korea
 Jil Matheson, National Statistician for the United Kingdom
 Jil Sander (born 1943), minimalist German fashion designer
 Jil Tracy (born 1973), Republican member of the Illinois House of Representatives
 Salome Jil, pseudonym of José Milla y Vidaurre (1822–1882), Guatemalan writer